Morgan County is a county in the north central part of the U.S. state of Alabama. As of the 2020 census, its population was 123,421. The county seat is Decatur. The county was created by the Alabama Territorial legislature on February 6, 1818, from land acquired from the Cherokee people in the Treaty of Turkeytown, and was originally called Cotaco County. On June 14, 1821, it was renamed in honor of American Revolutionary War General Daniel Morgan of Virginia. It is a prohibition or dry county, although alcohol sales are allowed in the cities of Decatur, Hartselle, and Priceville. Morgan County is included in the Decatur, AL Metropolitan Statistical Area, which is also included in the Huntsville-Decatur-Albertville, AL Combined Statistical Area. It is a part of the North, Northwest, and North-Central regions of Alabama.

Geography

River
Tennessee River

Adjacent counties
Madison County (northeast)
Marshall County (east)
Cullman County (south)
Lawrence County (west)
Limestone County (northwest)

National protected area
 Wheeler National Wildlife Refuge (part)

Demographics

2000 census
At the 2000 census there were 111,064 people, 43,602 households, and 31,437 families living in the county. There were 47,388 housing units at an average density of 81 per square mile (31/km2). The racial makeup of the county was 85.07% White, 11.24% Black or African American, 0.67% Native American, 0.45% Asian, 0.07% Pacific Islander, 1.25% from other races, and 1.25% from two or more races.  3.28% of the population were Hispanic or Latino of any race.
According to the census of 2000, the largest ancestry groups in Morgan County were English 60.1%, Scots-Irish 12.71%, and African 11.24%

Of the 43,602 households 33.50% had children under the age of 18 living with them, 57.40% were married couples living together, 11.20% had a female householder with no husband present, and 27.90% were non-families. 24.80% of households were one person and 9.40% were one person aged 65 or older.  The average household size was 2.51 and the average family size was 2.99.

The age distribution was 25.30% under the age of 18, 8.40% from 18 to 24, 30.10% from 25 to 44, 23.80% from 45 to 64, and 12.30% 65 or older.  The median age was 37 years. For every 100 females, there were 96.20 males.  For every 100 females age 18 and over, there were 93.50 males.

The median household income was $37,803 and the median family income  was $45,827. Males had a median income of $35,759 versus $21,885 for females. The per capita income for the county was $19,223.  About 9.70% of families and 12.30% of the population were below the poverty line, including 15.90% of those under age 18 and 12.80% of those age 65 or over.

2010 census
At the 2010 census there were 119,490 people, 47,030 households, and 33,135 families living in the county. There were 51,193 housing units at an average density of 88 per square mile (34/km2). The racial makeup of the county was 79.8% White, 11.9% Black or African American, 0.9% Native American, 0.6% Asian, 0.1% Pacific Islander, 4.8% from other races, and 2.0% from two or more races. 7.7% of the population were Hispanic or Latino of any race.
Of the 47,030 households 30.0% had children under the age of 18 living with them, 52.9% were married couples living together, 12.9% had a female householder with no husband present, and 29.5% were non-families. 25.9% of households were one person and 9.8% were one person aged 65 or older.  The average household size was 2.50 and the average family size was 2.99.

The age distribution was 24.0% under the age of 18, 8.4% from 18 to 24, 26.1% from 25 to 44, 27.5% from 45 to 64, and 14.1% 65 or older. The median age was 39 years. For every 100 females, there were 97.2 males. For every 100 females age 18 and over, there were 100.4 males.

The median household income was $44,349 and the median family income was $54,653. Males had a median income of $43,455 versus $29,270 for females. The per capita income for the county was $23,090. About 10.9% of families and 15.0% of the population were below the poverty line, including 21.9% of those under age 18 and 12.0% of those age 65 or over.

2020 census

As of the 2020 United States census, there were 123,421 people, 46,470 households, and 31,752 families residing in the county.

Government

Transportation

Major highways

 Interstate 65
 U.S. Route 31
 U.S. Highway 72 Alternate
 U.S. Highway 231
 State Route 20
 State Route 24
 State Route 36
 State Route 67
 State Route 157

Rail
CSX Transportation
Norfolk Southern Railway

Communities

Cities
Decatur (county seat; part of Decatur is in Limestone County)
Hartselle
Huntsville, (has land within Morgan County, but most of its population is in Madison County)

Towns
Eva
Falkville
Priceville
Somerville
Trinity

Unincorporated communities

 Basham 
 Brooksville
 Burningtree Mountain 
 Danville 
 Hulaco 
 Lacey's Spring
 Massey
 Morgan City (partly in Marshall County) 
 Moulton Heights 
 Neel
 Pence
 Ryan Crossroads 
 Six Mile
 Six Way
 Union Hill
 Valhermoso Springs
 Woodland Mills

Former city
 Albany/New Decatur

Former town
 Austinville
 Cedar Lake

Ghost town
 Lacon

Education
School districts include:
 Decatur City School District
 Hartselle City School District
 Morgan County School District

See also
 National Register of Historic Places listings in Morgan County, Alabama
 Properties on the Alabama Register of Landmarks and Heritage in Morgan County, Alabama
 Water contamination in Lawrence and Morgan Counties, Alabama

References

External links

 Decatur Morgan County Chamber of Commerce

 

 
1818 establishments in Alabama Territory
Populated places established in 1818
Huntsville-Decatur, AL Combined Statistical Area
Decatur metropolitan area, Alabama
Counties of Appalachia